"C.C. Waterback" is a song recorded by American country music artists Merle Haggard and George Jones. It was released in December 1982 as the second single from the album A Taste of Yesterday's Wine.  The song reached #10 on the Billboard Hot Country Singles & Tracks chart.  The song was written by Haggard.

Content
The song tells the story of a wild party "at the Jones' place" and the hangover that followed. At one point Merle laments that the woman he brought to the party "wound up in Jones' bed and I wound up on the floor." The track also features a New Orleans horn section.

The title of the song refers to a shot of Canadian Club whisky with a water chaser. While celebrating his new hit song in 1983 at a large Texas club, Merle Haggard bought a round of drinks for more than 5,000 fans in attendance, earning a spot in Guinness World Records that stood for decades.

Chart performance

References 

1982 singles
Merle Haggard songs
George Jones songs
Songs written by Merle Haggard
Song recordings produced by Billy Sherrill
Epic Records singles
1982 songs